Tonkin Highway is an  north–south highway and partial freeway in Perth, Western Australia, linking Perth Airport and Kewdale with the city's north-eastern and south-eastern suburbs. As of April 2020, the northern terminus is at the interchange with Brand Highway and Great Northern Highway in Muchea, and the southern terminus is at Thomas Road in Oakford. It forms the entire length of State Route 4, and connects to several major roads. Besides Brand Highway and Great Northern Highway, it also connects to Reid Highway, Great Eastern Highway, Leach Highway, Roe Highway, and Albany Highway.

Planning for the route began in the 1950s, but the first segment between Wattle Grove and Cloverdale was not opened until 1980. Over the next five years, the highway was extended north to Great Eastern Highway and south to Albany Highway, and a discontinuous section was constructed north of the Swan River. In 1988 the Redcliffe Bridge linked these sections, and three years later, Reid Highway became the northern terminus. The next major works on the highway, between 2003 and 2005, extended the highway south to Thomas Road.

The central section of Tonkin Highway was upgraded to a six-lane freeway-standard road between 2013 and 2015, as part of the Gateway WA project to improve the wider road network around Perth Airport. From 2016 to 2020, construction commenced to upgrade the section of Tonkin Highway between Guildford Road and the original Reid Highway terminus to a six-lane freeway-standard road, and to build a four-lane freeway standard road up to Muchea, as part of the NorthLink WA project. The extension was originally known as the Perth Darwin National Highway. Planning provisions have been made for Tonkin Highway to be extended south of Byford in the future.

Route description
Tonkin Highway forms the entire length of State Route 4. It is a dual carriageway road maintained by Main Roads Western Australia, and subject to control of access along its entire length. Some junctions on the highway are at-grade and traffic light controlled; however, all junctions north of Hale Road in Wattle Grove and junctions with Albany Highway and Corfield Street in Gosnells, are freeway-standard with grade-separated interchanges. The central section of the highway between Reid Highway and Roe Highway is primarily six lanes wide; the remainder of the highway is primarily four lanes wide. A shared pedestrian and bicycle path is built alongside most of Tonkin Highway; namely between Muchea and Hale Road, as well as south of Mills Road East. In most other sections, the highway's sealed shoulders also function as bicycle lanes.

Main Roads Western Australia monitors traffic volume across the state's road network, including several locations along Tonkin Highway. The section near Perth Airport, south of Great Eastern Highway, is the busiest, averaging over 56,000 vehicles per weekday in 2007–08, and over 57,000 in 2008–09. North of the Swan River, the traffic volume gradually decreased to under 40,000 vehicles per weekday near the northern terminus, in 2007–08. Measurements in 2008–09 showed the lowest volume to be under 10,000 vehicles per weekday near the southern terminus, north of Thomas Road.

In 2013, immediately preceding the upgrade of Tonkin Highway's central section to a six-lane freeway-standard road, junctions in and around Kewdale, Forrestfield and Perth Airport carried traffic volumes beyond their capacity during peak periods. The slowest section was from Leach Highway to Horrie Miller Drive, which recorded an average of  during the afternoon peak period. Traffic volume, exceeding 50,000 vehicles per day in 2012, is forecast to almost double by 2031. Traffic modelling showed that leaving the current network of traffic light controlled intersections in place would have resulted in gridlock by 2021.

Muchea to Ellenbrook

Tonkin Highway commences at a roundabout interchange with Brand Highway and Great Northern Highway near the town of Muchea in the Shire of Chittering of the Wheatbelt region. The interchange is characterised by both the installation of curvy green street lighting known as "wiggle poles" on both the bridge passing over the roundabout as well as on the westbound approach to the roundabout as well as a large road train assembly area to the southeast of the interchange.

After , Tonkin Highway passes over the old Brand Highway connection between Muchea and Great Northern Highway (now known as Granary Drive) before curving to the southwest to pass over Muchea South Road and the Midland railway line. The highway then enters the Perth metropolitan region (the City of Swan LGA, or local government area) and provides a western bypass of the town of Bullsbrook. The highway curves back to the south to pass over a roundabout interchange with Neaves Road. After , Tonkin Highway passes over another roundabout interchange with Stock Road West on the eastern side and Cooper Road on the west. A Heavy Vehicle Inspection Area is located immediately to the south.

After a further  Tonkin Highway curves to the south-west, upon which the farmland that dominated the first section of the highway gives way to the more undulating and less fertile Bassendean dune system. The transition is marked by the presence of a fauna overpass crossing the highway. Just south of the overpass the highway starts skirting the western edge of the major suburb of Ellenbrook for the next .

Ellenbrook to the Swan River

Tonkin Highway then descends from the dunes to cross under a roundabout interchange with The Promenade to the east and Birralee Road to the west in Ellenbrook, after which it continues southwest and meets Gnangara Road at a parclo interchange. The highway then curves back to the south and passes between the suburbs of Cullacabardee and Whiteman, replacing a section of Beechboro Road North. The highway heads south to cross over Baal Street, after which another roundabout interchange is reached with Hepburn Avenue and the remainder of Beechboro Road North. After passing underneath Marshall Road, Tonkin Highway arrives at a major free-flowing combination interchange with Reid Highway, previously the northern terminus of the highway. The wiggle pole street lighting reappears here, though the lights are yellow in colour this time. The highway then gains an additional lane and continues southwards, forming the border between the residential suburbs of Beechboro and Noranda; after , the highway enters the City of Bayswater LGA.

Tonkin Highway continues southwards through a narrow S curve that realigns the highway further east. The border between Embleton and Bayswater follows Beechboro Road, which is discontinuous either side of Tonkin Highway. The highway continues through Bayswater, between residential housing to the north-east and an industrial area to the south-west. After  the S curve ends, with the highway now travelling between industrial and commercial properties. There is another interchange, this time a single-point urban interchange  further south, with Collier Road. The next major road the highway meets is Guildford Road,  further south. It is connected via a grade-separated interchange folded diamond interchange, with all the ramps located south of Guildford Road; to the north is the Midland railway line, and the parallel road Railway Parade, which the highway passes over. Tonkin Highway crosses the river via the  Redcliffe Bridge, which takes the highway into , in the City of Belmont LGA.

Perth Airport

It is a diamond interchange, with an additional eastbound to southbound looped entry ramp. Previously, Great Eastern Highway's intersection with the southbound exit ramp also connected to Brearley Avenue which, until September 2018, provided one of the main access roads to Perth Airport's domestic terminal. However Brearley Avenue was closed to allow construction on the Redcliffe railway station. Beyond this interchange, Tonkin Highway, once again with three lanes, is within 's residential areas. Dunreath Drive replaced the Brearley Avenue entrance as the main access road from Tonkin Highway to Perth Airport's domestic terminal in 2015, it is a partial dogbone interchange, with the eastern side free-flowing while the western side controlled with a roundabout.

After , the highway turns south, travelling in that direction for  before reaching  and curving back to the south-east, meeting Leach Highway and Airport Drive. Known as the Grand Gateway interchange, it is the primary access to Perth Airport's international terminal (replacing Horrie Miller Drive in 2015). It is a modified three-level combination interchange with two loop ramps (Airport Drive west to Tonkin Highway north and Leach Highway east to Tonkin Highway south). These movements, along with another five of the eight available between the three roads are free-flowing. Only Tonkin Highway north to Leach Highway west is controlled by traffic lights at the subsequent Leach Highway/Abernethy Road interchange before entering the highway itself to minimise the danger posed by weaving. It is located at the borders between three suburbs: Cloverdale to the west,  to the south, and the Perth Airport to the north-east.

Now a single-point urban interchange, the initial signalised intersection was the original primary access road for Perth Airport's international terminals. Horrie Miller Drive now serves the industrial areas south of the terminal, and provides a secondary access to the terminals. After another , the highway reaches Abernethy Road. The only connections are a north-westbound looped exit ramp that merges with a local road, McDowell Street, north of Abernethy Road and a south-eastbound entrance ramp built in 2014. Initially built as a signalised diamond interchange favouring Tonkin Highway, the Gateway WA project has since modified the connection into a hybrid diamond-stack interchange, with all Tonkin Highway southbound movements free-flowing, along with both left turns from Roe to Tonkin Highway.

Forrestfield to Oakford
Tonkin Highway travels in a south-easterly direction between residential areas in Forrestfield and Wattle Grove, reaching Hale Road after . Over the next , the highway curves back to the south. At this point it intersects Welshpool Road East, and is entirely within the suburb of Wattle Grove. After , the highway crosses Kelvin Road, and continues south-east for a further . It briefly passes the industrial part of Maddington, before curving slightly around an urban development to reach intersections with Gosnells Road East, and subsequently Gosnells Road West. Tonkin Highway crosses the Canning River  further south, entering .

Tonkin Highway meets Albany Highway at a folded diamond interchange. It continues south-westbound, passing between Champion Lakes to the south-east, and undeveloped land to the north-west. After , there is a T junction with Champion Drive. The highway continues southwest for another  until it reaches a set of traffic lights with Ranford Road. Tonkin Highway turns south, along a  curve, and meets Armadale Road at another set of traffic lights. It passes Forrest Road after , only connecting to the eastern leg at a T junction, and  further on, reaches Rowley Road. Following this traffic controlled intersection, Tonkin Highway is within the Shire of Serpentine-Jarrahdale LGA. Tonkin Highway ends at Thomas Road, which connects traffic to Kwinana Freeway and South Western Highway.

History

A proposal for a highway along a similar alignment was first proposed in 1955, as part of a network of arterial roads under a metropolitan-wide plan produced for the Western Australian government by Gordon Stephenson and Alastair Hepburn. The road reservation was formally gazetted in the 1963 Metropolitan Region Scheme. It was first named "Beechboro-Gosnells Highway", the name coming from the two suburbs it was originally planned to link. Like most Perth arterial road projects, the highway was built in stages.  It was initially constructed as a  dual carriageway, from Welshpool Road, Wattle Grove to Hardey Road in Cloverdale, which opened on 16 June 1980. A further , that linked the new highway to Albany Highway in Gosnells, was completed in December 1980. This $6.1 million section, which officially opened on 22 December 1980, was the start of a new route between Gosnells and Bellevue, and reduced traffic volume and congestion on Albany Highway.

The third segment to be constructed was a  section north of the Swan River, from Railway Parade in Bayswater to Morley Drive, which opened on 11 July 1984. This $3.5 million section was constructed by Thiess Contractors Pty Ltd, with Taylor Woodrow International Ltd responsible for constructing the Broun Avenue bridge. Stage 4 linked Hardey Road and Great Eastern Highway, and included the construction of four bridges over the Forrestfield railway marshalling yards, the first bridges in Australia to be constructed using the incremental launch technique. Upon opening on 1 May 1985, Beechboro-Gosnells Highway was renamed "Tonkin Highway", in honour of former Premier of Western Australia John Tonkin. Tonkin had also been the Minister for Works during the planning and construction of the Narrows Bridge and Kwinana Freeway in the 1950s. A ceremony was held at Redcliffe on 1 May by the Premier of Western Australia Brian Burke, who unveiled a plaque. Tonkin, who at the time was aged 83, cut the ribbon at the ceremony to officially open the new Forrestfield to Redcliffe section of the highway. A grade-separated interchange was constructed at Great Eastern Highway in 1986, which included a six lane road bridge over Tonkin Highway and a pedestrian subway. It was constructed earlier than initially planned, as heavy traffic from Perth Airport was expected during the 1987 America's Cup.

Construction on a link between the northern and southern sections of Tonkin Highway began in 1988. Included in this $48 million stage was the Redcliffe Bridge over the Swan River, and an interchange with Guildford Road, north of the bridge. The  Redcliffe Bridge, also built using the incremental launching technique, was designed to carry six traffic lanes, as well as pedestrian and cycle paths that could be converted into traffic lanes when required. The bridge deck is supported by a narrow central section with cantilever extensions on each side, as a "big heavy bridge would have looked out of place" at a relatively narrow section of the river. The bridge was designed by Maunsell and Partners Pty Ltd and constructed by Thiess. It was opened on 16 April 1988, and received awards for engineering excellence from both the national and state branches of the Institute of Engineers, Australia.

The highway was then extended northwards, reaching Benara Road on 18 December 1989, and Reid Highway on 11 November 1991. Tonkin Highway spent a decade remaining largely unchanged, linking Reid Highway in Malaga with Albany Highway in Gosnells. In 2003, construction of a new southern extension commenced. Planning and Infrastructure Minister Alannah MacTiernan and the Member for Roleystone, Martin Whitely, participated in a sod turning ceremony on 27 June 2003, to mark the start of the project. At the time, the $140 million extension was the largest single road project in Western Australia. The project was completed in two stages, with Armadale Road as the midpoint. The first  section, including a new interchange at Albany Highway, was opened by Premier Geoff Gallop and Alannah MacTiernan on 2 April 2005. The original connection to Albany Highway was renamed Ferres Drive. The Forrestdale Business Park and the Champion Lakes precinct were constructed concurrently with the project, to encourage industrial and residential development alongside the new highway section. The remaining , from Armadale Road through to Thomas Road, opened a year ahead of schedule on 16 December 2005. The new extension improved links with Kwinana, Armadale, Rockingham and Byford. It also provided a new freight route, diverting heavy vehicle traffic away from the existing road network and residential areas.

Gateway WA

Between 2014 and 2016, the $1 billion Gateway WA Perth Airport and Freight Access Project was undertaken to upgrade the road network around Perth Airport. At the time it was the largest project Main Roads Western Australia had ever undertaken, covering the upgrade of Tonkin and Leach highways, and the construction of four new interchanges. The project was jointly funded by state and federal governments, which provided $317.5 million and $686.4 million respectively.

As part of the project, Tonkin Highway was expanded from two to three lanes in both directions, between Great Eastern Highway and Roe Highway, with the existing intersections in this section becoming grade separated. A new diamond interchange was constructed with Dunreath Drive to provide access to Perth Airport Terminals 3 and 4, the domestic terminal precinct, thus replacing Brearley Avenue as the main access to the precinct.

Access to Terminals 1 and 2, the international terminal precinct, was provided via the Grand Gateway, a freeway-to-freeway combination interchange at Leach Highway and the newly built Airport Drive. The Horrie Miller Drive and Kewdale Road intersection, formerly one of Perth's busiest intersections, was also replaced by a single-point urban interchange; providing an alternate route to the international terminals, as well as improving access to the Kewdale industrial area and freight facilities at Perth Airport. The existing diamond interchange with Roe Highway was upgraded to a partial freeway-to-freeway interchange, but with plans to further upgrade it to a completely free-flowing interchange in the future.

In January 2013, works were undertaken to protect or relocate sections of the Canning Trunk water main and the Dampier to Bunbury Natural Gas Pipeline in the vicinity of the project. Construction on the Gateway WA project officially began on 1 February 2013 with a groundbreaking ceremony attended by the state and federal transport ministers, Troy Buswell and Anthony Albanese. The whole project was due to be completed by 2017. However it was moved to March 2016, due to construction moving faster than expected. Works were finished on 12 April 2016.

Intersection Upgrades
During 2016, the intersection with Gosnells Road West was upgraded with longer and extra turning lanes, better cycling and pedestrian facilities, and better street lighting and CCTV as part of the Black Spot program. This project was funded by the Western Australian State government, and cost $2.4 million. During 2016 and 2017, as part of Main Roads Western Australia's Traffic Congestion Management Program, the intersection with Kelvin Road was upgraded to improve traffic flow and safety. New and longer turning lanes were added. This project cost $7.5 million and was funded by the Western Australian state government.

NorthLink WA

NorthLink WA was a project that involved both the northern section of Tonkin Highway upgraded, and the road extended northwards to bypass Great Northern Highway within Perth and the wider Swan Valley. These two component projects are separately funded, with both the state and federal governments contributing to each project. Construction began in 2016, and was completed on 23 April 2020.

Intersection Upgrades
The federal government allocated $140.6 million to grade-separate Tonkin Highway's intersections south of Reid Highway, namely Benara Road, Morley Drive and Collier Road. The funding is part of the next five-year phase of the Nation Building Program, from 2014–15 to 2018–19. The upgrades are intended to improve freight transportation along the highway. The total cost is expected to be $281.2 million. In the lead up to the 2013 Australian federal election, which resulted in a change of government, Labor candidate for Perth, Alannah MacTiernan, accused the then-opposition's candidate of lying to the electorate over their commitment to the upgrade. The official policy costings did not contain specific funding for the project. However, an opposition spokesperson claimed it was "in the current forward estimates", and not in the costing, as the upgrade was neither a "new and accelerated" project, nor a project that would definitely not be funded.

Northern extension
Construction started in June 2017 to extend Tonkin Highway north, past Ellenbrook and through the Swan Valley to Brand Highway and Great Northern Highway in Muchea. Interchanges are planned at junctions with Reid Highway, Hepburn Avenue and Beechboro Road North, Gnangara Road, The Promenade, Stock Road, Neaves Road and Brand Highway and Great Northern Highway. The third stage was originally planned to be a two-lane single-carriageway road with at-grade intersections, with provision for upgrading in the future. However, during the tender process it was found that the ultimate plan with a four-lane highway and grade separation could be completed within the existing budget. The previously planned route of the PDNH, prior to 2012, followed Lord Street, east of Whiteman Park.

The extension was opened in stages: the first section north of Reid Highway between Hepburn Avenue and Gnangara Road opened in January 2019 (which also saw Beechboro Road North between the two roads permanently closed at its northern end) with the section between Reid Highway and Hepburn Avenue making the highway continuous in March. Upon the opening of this section traffic was temporarily diverted onto what was the T-junction with Beechboro Road North and Gnangara Road, before eventually being transferred onto the new interchange. The highway was then extended to The Promenade in August 2019, completing the central section of the project. Following delays, the project as a whole was eventually completed when the northern section officially opened on 23 April 2020.

Dunreath Drive
Dunreath Drive, a local road that originally ran parallel with Tonkin Highway to the east, provided an alternative route between the Perth Airport terminal buildings. Significant changes were made to the road during the evolution of Tonkin Highway during the 2010s and into 2020.

On 16 April 2012, an intersection linking Dunreath Drive with Tonkin Highway was opened. This traffic light controlled at-grade intersection allowed a more direct access to and from the international terminal of Perth Airport, bypassing Tonkin Highway's intersections with Leach Highway and Kewdale Road/Horrie Miller Drive. However, the intersection did not allow northbound travellers to bypass the Great Eastern Highway interchange in order to access the domestic terminal. The intersection was later removed on 16 July 2015 as part of the work with Gateway WA.

In its place was a dogbone interchange linking Tonkin Highway to Dunreath Drive, allowing full movements to and from the T3/T4 precinct. Since commissioning, the area between the two roads was significantly developed, with a Direct Factory Outlet centre opening in 2018, followed by a Costco in 2020. Due to the increase of traffic the eastern roundabout was removed during the first half of 2020, with the western roundabout seeing peak traffic signals installed.

Future works
A number of improvement works are planned for Tonkin Highway, which will see most of the central and northern sections upgraded to a freeway-standard road with grade separated interchanges. The southern end is also planned to be extended to South Western Highway south of Byford.

Tonkin Highway "Gap"
As a result of the upgrades north and south of the Swan River, the section between the Collier Road and Dunreath Drive interchanges has become known as the Tonkin Gap, where the road reduces from six to four lanes crossing the Swan River, Guildford Road, Railway Parade and the Midland line. There are plans to widen this section of highway to six lanes, including duplication of the Redcliffe Bridge. It is also planned to build north and southbound collector-distributor roads between Guildford Road interchange and Great Eastern Highway interchange (which will also receive an additional westbound to northbound loop ramp) and a fully grade separated principle shared path (PSP) on the western side of Tonkin Highway from north of Guildford Road interchange to Stanton Road.

Roe to Kelvin Upgrade
Planning is also underway to upgrade Tonkin Highway to freeway standard south of Roe Highway, with the  section between Roe Highway and Kelvin Road expected to be looked at first. It is planned to widen the highway to six lanes with the intersections with Welshpool Road East and Kelvin Road to be converted to full interchanges as well as construct a new cycle path parallel with the highway. The other at-grade intersection, Hale Road, is provisionally planned to be converted to a half-diamond interchange with northbound-facing ramps connecting to Tonkin Highway through the neighbouring Roe Highway interchange.

Southern extension
Tonkin Highway reaches past the edge of suburbia at its southern extent. Planning provides for it to be extended when required. The initial plans indicated the extension would continue south through undeveloped or semi-rural areas such as Mundijong, Cardup and Jarrahdale. South of Mundijong, the planned route would deviate east to terminate at South Western Highway near Jarrahdale Road, which would then be upgraded. Following the 2001 state election, the new government abandoned the Jarrahdale Road option, preferring a shorter route that deviated to South Western Highway near Orton Street, closer to Byford. In July 2012, seven years after the previous extension was completed, the Minister for Transport announced the formation of a community working group to investigate an extension of Tonkin Highway beyond Thomas Road. The group met several times to identify and evaluate possible solutions to traffic congestion in the area, and prepare a strategic business case for the next extension. , the preferred options are to extend the highway to South Western Highway, at a location either south of Lakes Road or south of Mundijong Road.

The long-term plan for Tonkin Highway extending southwards, outlined in Perth's transport at 3.5 million plan is for Tonkin Highway to be eventually extended as a freeway standard link to Forrest Highway south of Pinjarra, but no planning has been done for this, and the transport plan has said that this is very far off in the future, and is unlikely to happen until after 2050.

Interchanges and intersections

See also

 Highways in Australia
 List of highways in Western Australia
 List of major roads in Perth, Western Australia

Notes

References

External links

 Main Roads Western Australia
 Gateway WA – Perth Airport and Freight Access Project
 1955 Atlas – "Plan for the Metropolitan Region" (Stephenson & Hepburn). Plate 9 is a map of proposed developments, including a highway on a similar alignment to Tonkin Highway.

Highways and freeways in Perth, Western Australia
Articles containing video clips